Khemisset (Amazigh language: Zemmur) is an Amazigh town in northern Morocco with a population of 131,542 recorded in the 2014 Moroccan census. It is situated on the A2 motorway between Rabat (81 km) and Meknès (57 km), and is the capital of Khémisset Province.

From 1912 to 1914 the French built a 600 mm narrow gauge railway from Rabat via Souk el Abra des Sehoul, Tiflet, Dar Caid Bou Driss to Khemisset. It was abandoned in 1935 and lifted before 1942. Between Tiflet, and Khemisset the old track bed of narrow gauge line  was later built to Rabat Khemisset main road. The 18 of November Stadium has a capacity of 10,000 and hosts the home games of Ittihad Khémisset. A synthetic grass pitch was installed in 2011.

The population of Khemisset (Zemmour) are Berbers/Amazigh of the Middle Atlas. They speak the Moroccan Amazigh language, particularly the Central Atlas dialect. Also, people in Khemisset and mainly the younger generations speak Moroccan Darija.

Notable people  
Aziz Ouhadi, Track and field runner
Brahim Boutayeb, former runner
Hussein Ammouta, football coach
Najat Aatabou, Singer,songwriter and composer

References

Cities in Morocco
Populated places in Khémisset Province
Khemisset